Middleholm,  also known as Midland Isle, is a small island lying off southwest Pembrokeshire in Wales, between the island of Skomer and the mainland in the community of Marloes and St Brides. It is separated from the mainland by Jack Sound and from Skomer by Little Sound.

History
The name Middleholm was documented in 1325 in the reign of Edward III, when ferreters were paid for catching rabbits. The island has been in use for considerably longer, with traces of Iron Age walling, and may have been used for summer grazing, despite the lack of natural fresh water. Since 1966, when the rabbit population was killed by myxomatosis, the island has been ungrazed. The name Midland Isle has been used at least as far back as 1578, when it was abbreviated in Latin as Midlan Insul. This name was also used in 1833, when it was cited in Lewis's A Topographical Dictionary of Wales. Modern Ordnance Survey maps use the latter name.

Geology
The island is formed largely from a suite of volcanic rocks of Aeronian age (early Silurian) assigned to the Skomer Volcanic Group.

Wildlife
The island is known for its seabirds, including Manx shearwaters and Atlantic puffins, and for its plants, including red fescue, sea beet and common tree-mallow.

Ownership
The island is owned and managed by the National Trust. It is not open to the public.

References

External links

Islands of Pembrokeshire